"Don't Let It Bring You Down" is the seventh track on Neil Young's 1970 studio album After the Gold Rush.

Background
The song was written by Young. It also appears on the 1971 Crosby, Stills, Nash & Young live album 4 Way Street as well as Young's 2007 album Live at Massey Hall 1971, which was recorded in 1971, and Young's 2013 album Live at the Cellar Door, which was recorded in 1970. John Reed wrote an arrangement of this for The Hampton String Quartet in 2006.

The song is played in double drop C tuning, which is similar to double drop D; however, the whole guitar is down tuned a whole step first, making the guitar strings C, G, C, F, A, and C.

On 4 Way Street, Young says, "Here is a new song, it's guaranteed to bring you right down, it's called 'Don't Let It Bring You Down'. It sorta starts off real slow and then fizzles out altogether." The crowd then roars with laughter.

Cover versions
 Perhaps the first cover was recorded by Caleb Quaye's band Hookfoot in 1971.
 The song was covered by Sting's pre-Police band Last Exit, as part of their 1974 Impulse Studio Demos.
 It was also covered by Victoria Williams on the 1989 anthology album The Bridge: A Tribute to Neil Young.
 Annie Lennox covered the song on her 1995 Medusa album; her version also appeared in the movie American Beauty (1999), although it wasn't included on the film's soundtrack album.
 A performance of the song by Seal appears on his 2006 live album One Night to Remember.
 The alternative rock band Q And Not U covered the song for the compilation album Don't Know When I'll Be Back Again.
 The 1990s alternative rock band Weeping Tile covered the song on their first album, eePee.
 Alexa Ray Joel covered the song on her 2006 EP entitled Sketches.
 The Danish band Kellermensch covered the song in a hard rock/metal version on the 2009 album Kellermensch.
 Wolfmother played this song acoustically in 2009 and included it on the Japanese version of Cosmic Egg.
 Chris Cornell covered it live on his Acoustic Songbook show at the Troubadour.
 Andy Pratt covered the song on his 2011 release All That Glitters.
 Guns N' Roses covered the song in 2012 during their Appetite for Democracy residency in Vegas.
 Manfred Mann's Earth Band often performs the song live in an up-tempo arrangement. One such version can be found on the collection Odds & Sods – Mis-takes & Out-takes and another one, in a slightly different arrangement, on the DVD Angel Station in Moscow.
 The Hold Steady covered it live on August 30, 2011 at Variety Playhouse in Atlanta, Georgia.
 Everything Everything covered the song on a Radio 1 session on 25 July 2017. It was later released on their 2018 EP, A Deeper Sea.
Jazz pianist Brad Mehldau covered the song on his 2020 album Suite: April 2020.
 Cowboy Junkies covered it on the 2022 covers album Songs of Recollection

References

Neil Young songs
1970 songs
Songs written by Neil Young
Song recordings produced by David Briggs (record producer)
Song recordings produced by Neil Young